Love Is the Devil: Study for a Portrait of Francis Bacon is a 1998 film produced by The British Film Institute and BBC Film. It was written and directed by John Maybury and stars Derek Jacobi, Daniel Craig and Tilda Swinton. A fictional biography of  painter Francis Bacon (Jacobi), it concentrates on his strained relationship with George Dyer (Craig), a small-time thief. The film draws heavily on the authorised biography of Bacon, The Gilded Gutter Life of Francis Bacon by Daniel Farson, and is dedicated to him.

It won three awards at the Edinburgh International Film Festival: Best New British Feature (director John Maybury) and two Best British Performance awards, one for Jacobi and the other for future James Bond actor Craig. The film was also screened in the Un Certain Regard section at the 1998 Cannes Film Festival. Craig's performance was well received by critics, acknowledging it as his breakthrough role.

Cast
 Derek Jacobi – Francis Bacon
 Daniel Craig – George Dyer
 Tilda Swinton – Muriel Belcher
 Anne Lambton – Isabel Rawsthorne
 Adrian Scarborough – Daniel Farson
 Karl Johnson – John Deakin
 Annabel Brooks – Henrietta Moraes
 Richard Newbould – Blond Billy (as Richard Newbold)
 Ariel de Ravenel – French Official
 Tallulah – Ian Board
 Andy Linden – Ken Bidwell
 David Kennedy – Joe Furneval
 Gary Hume – Volker Dix
 Damian Dibben – Brighton Rent Boy
 Antony Cotton – Brighton Rent Boy
 Hamish Bowles – David Hockney
 Martin Meister - Person in Brighton Pub

Release
Love Is the Devil was released theatrically by Artificial Eye on 18 September 1998 in the UK and grossed £259,421 ($0.4 million). It was released in the United States on 7 October 1998 and grossed $354,004, for a worldwide total in excess of $0.8 million.

The film was first broadcast on BBC Two on 26 March 2000.

References

External links

 
 
Roger Ebert review

1998 television films
1998 films
British television films
British biographical films
Francis Bacon (artist)
Films directed by John Maybury
Biographical films about painters
Films scored by Ryuichi Sakamoto
1990s British films